The 2007–08 Liga III season was the 52nd season of Liga III, the third tier of the Romanian football league system. It was the second in this format (six series of 18 teams each).

The winners of each division got promoted to the 2008-09 Liga II season. There were also two playoff tournaments held at neutral venues involving the second placed teams, one with those from series 1, 2 and 3, the other with those from series 4, 5, and 6. The winners of the playoffs also got promoted to the 2008-09 Liga II season.
The bottom three from each division were relegated at the end of the season to the county football leagues (Liga IV). From the 15th placed teams, another three were relegated. To determine these teams, separate standings were computed, using only the games played against clubs ranked 1st through 14th.

Team changes

To Liga III
Relegated from Liga II
 Cetatea Suceava
 Building Vânju Mare
 FC Snagov
 Baia Mare
 Chimia Brazi
 Unirea Dej
 CF Brăila
 Auxerre Lugoj

Promoted from Liga IV
 Filipeștii de Pădure
 Unirea Tărlungeni 
 Juventus Bascov
 FCM Târgoviște II
 Turris Turnu Măgurele
 CFR Marmosim Simeria 
 CFR Craiova
 Nuova Mama Mia Becicherecu Mic
 Kozara Vințu de Jos
 FC Bihor II Tileagd
 Turul Micula 
 Marmaţia Sighetu Marmaţiei
 Rarăul Câmpulung Moldovenesc	
 Gaz Metan Târgu Mureș
 Onix Râmnicu Sărat
 Bârlad
 Cetatea Târgu Neamț
 Bujorul Târgu Bujor
 CSO Ianca
 Abatorul Slobozia
 Medgidia

From Liga III
Promoted to Liga II
 Unirea Focșani
 Dinamo II București
 Concordia Chiajna
 Severnav Drobeta-Turnu Severin
 Arieșul Turda
 Liberty Salonta
 Inter Gaz București
 Mureșul Deva

Relegated to Liga IV
 Petrolul Moinești 
 KSE Târgu Secuiesc 
 Roseal Odorheiu Secuiesc 
 Fotbal Oil Terminal Constanța
 Petrolul Brăila
 Phoenix Ulmu
 Politehnica Timișoara
 Petrolul Târgoviște
 Avântul Mâneciu
 Flacăra Moreni
 Unirea Mărăcineni
 Petrolul Țicleni
 Minerul Uricani
 Florea Voicilă Alexandria
 Dacia Orăștie
 FC Sibiu
 Someș Gaz Beclean
 Olimpia Satu Mare
 Victoria Carei
 Fink Fenster Petrești
 Florența Still Model Odoreu

Renamed teams and other changes 
EMC Rovinari was renamed as Energia Rovinari.

Timișul Albina was renamed as Alto Gradimento Albina.

FC Ghimbav was renamed as Royal Club Ghimbav.

Astra Ploiești was renamed as FC Ploiești.

Gaz Metan Podari was moved from Podari to Craiova and was renamed as Gaz Metan CFR Craiova.

Maris Târgu Mureș was moved from Târgu Mureș to Ungheni and was renamed as ASA Unirea Ungheni.

Fortuna Covaci took the place of Tim Giroc Timișoara.

Internațional Curtea de Argeș took the place of Voința Macea.

Cisnădie took the place of Kozara Vințu de Jos.

FC Balș took the place of Oltul Slatina.

FC Sibiu took the place of Soda Ocna Mureș.

Victoria Brănești took the place of Transkurier Sfântu Gheorghe.

FC Argeș Pitești II took the place of Juventus Bascov.

Năvodari took the place of Aurora Mangalia.

Inter Pantelimon took the place of FCM Târgoviște II.

Sparta Mediaș withdrew due to financial problems.

Olimpia Satu Mare was spared from relegation.

League tables

Seria I

Seria II

Seria III

Seria IV

Seria V

Seria VI

Playoffs

Group 1 

Matches played at Câmpina on Poiana Stadium.
 Buftea – Juventus București 2–2 (2–4 penalty kickout)
 Buftea – Aerostar Bacău 6–3
 Aerostar Bacău – Juventus București 1–1

Group 2 

Matches played at Alba-Iulia on Victoria-Cetate Stadium.
 Gaz Metan CFR Craiova – ACU Arad 1–5
 Avântul Reghin – Gaz Metan CFR Craiova  2–0
 Avântul Reghin – ACU Arad 0–0 (3–4 penalty kickout)

See also 

 2007–08 Liga I
 2007–08 Liga II
 2007–08 Liga IV

References

Liga III seasons
3
Romania